Lophocampa texta is a moth of the family Erebidae. It was described by Gottlieb August Wilhelm Herrich-Schäffer in 1855. It is found in Brazil.

References

 Natural History Museum Lepidoptera generic names catalog

texta
Moths described in 1855